Mischa Mischakoff (April 16, 1895 – February 1, 1981) was an outstanding violinist who, as a concertmaster, led many of America's greatest orchestras from the 1920s to the 1960s.

Mischakoff was born in Proskuriv (today Khlmelnytskyi), Ukraine as Mischa Fishberg.  In 1921 he escaped from Russia with, among others, his friend and colleague, cellist Gregor Piatigorsky, with whom he had played in the Bolshoi Theatre in Moscow.  Mischakoff emigrated to the United States later that year, becoming a naturalized citizen in 1927.

He led the string sections of the St. Petersburg Conservatory Orchestra, St. Petersburg Philharmonic Orchestra, Moscow Bolshoi Theatre, Warsaw Philharmonic Orchestra, then, after his arrival in the United States, the New York Symphony under Walter Damrosch (1920–1927), the Philadelphia Orchestra under Leopold Stokowski (1927–1930), the Chicago Symphony Orchestra under Frederick Stock (1930–1937), the NBC Symphony Orchestra under Arturo Toscanini (1937–1952), the Detroit Symphony Orchestra under Paul Paray (1952–1968), as well as, in retirement, the Baltimore Symphony Orchestra.

Mischa Mischakoff also led the Mischakoff String Quartet in the various cities where he lived, and between 1940 and 1952 he taught at the Juilliard School in New York. He then taught at Wayne State University in Detroit between 1952 and 1981.

Mischakoff died on February 1, 1981, in Petoskey, Michigan. He owned four Stradivari violins, on which he appeared as soloist and recitalist, as well as a number of other fine violins by old and contemporary makers.

Notes 

The biography of Mischa Mischakoff does not include his long association as concertmaster of the Chautauqua Symphony at
Chautauqua Institution, Chautauqua NY.  There, Mischakoff also led the Mischakoff String Quartet which gave weekly
recitals during the summer season.

References

1895 births
1981 deaths
Musicians from Khmelnytskyi, Ukraine
People from Proskurovsky Uyezd
Ukrainian Jews
20th-century Ukrainian musicians
Jewish classical musicians
American classical violinists
Male classical violinists
American male violinists
Ukrainian classical violinists
Concertmasters
Concertmasters of the Philadelphia Orchestra
Musicians of the Philadelphia Orchestra
Juilliard School faculty
American people of Ukrainian-Jewish descent
20th-century classical violinists
20th-century American male musicians
Ukrainian SSR emigrants to the United States
20th-century American violinists